The Province of Lower Silesia (Silesian German: Provinz Niederschläsing;) was a province of the Free State of Prussia from 1919 to 1945. Between 1938 and 1941 it was reunited with Upper Silesia as the Province of Silesia. The capital of Lower Silesia was Breslau (now  Wrocław in Poland). The province was further divided into two administrative regions (Regierungsbezirke), Breslau and Liegnitz.

The province was not congruent with the historical region of Lower Silesia, which now lies mainly in Poland. It additionally comprised the Upper Lusatian districts of Görlitz, Rothenburg and Hoyerswerda in the west, that until 1815 had belonged to the Kingdom of Saxony, as well as the former County of Kladsko in the southeast.

The province was disestablished at the end of World War II and with the implementation of the Oder–Neisse line in 1945, the area east of the Neisse river fell to the Republic of Poland. The smaller western part was incorporated into the German states of Saxony and Brandenburg.

Administrative regions

Regierungsbezirk Breslau

Urban districts / Stadtkreise 
City of Breslau
City of Brieg
City of Schweidnitz
City of Waldenburg

Rural districts / Landkreise 
Landkreis Breslau
Landkreis Brieg
Landkreis Frankenstein
Landkreis Glatz
Landkreis Groß Wartenberg
Landkreis Guhrau
Landkreis Habelschwerdt
Landkreis Militsch
Landkreis Namslau
Landkreis Neumarkt
Landkreis Oels
Landkreis Ohlau
Landkreis Reichenbach (im Eulengebirge)
Landkreis Schweidnitz
Landkreis Strehlen
Landkreis Trebnitz
Landkreis Waldenburg
Landkreis Wohlau

Regierungsbezirk Liegnitz

Urban districts / Stadtkreise 
City of Glogau
City of Görlitz
City of Hirschberg im Riesengebirge
City of Liegnitz

Rural districts / Landkreise 
Landkreis Bunzlau
Landkreis Fraustadt
Landkreis Freystadt i. Niederschles.
Landkreis Glogau
Landkreis Görlitz
Landkreis Goldberg
Landkreis Grünberg
Landkreis Hirschberg
Landkreis Hoyerswerda
Landkreis Jauer
Landkreis Landeshut
Landkreis Lauban
Landkreis Liegnitz
Landkreis Löwenberg
Landkreis Lüben
Landkreis Rothenburg (Ob. Laus.)
Landkreis Sprottau

Post-1945 population 
During the Polish post-war census of December 1950, data about the pre-war places of residence of the inhabitants as of August 1939 was collected. In case of children born between September 1939 and December 1950, their origin was reported based on the pre-war places of residence of their mothers. Thanks to this data it is possible to reconstruct the pre-war geographical origin of the post-war population. The same area corresponding to pre-1938 Province of Lower Silesia east of the Oder-Neisse line (which became Polish in 1945) was inhabited in December 1950 by:

Over 90% of the 1950 inhabitants were new to the region, with less than 10% residing in the province already back in August 1939 (so called autochthons, who had German citizenship before World War II and were granted Polish citizenship after 1945). The largest group among new inhabitants were Poles expelled from areas of Eastern Poland annexed by the USSR. The second largest group came from Southern Poland (from Kraków, Rzeszów, Lublin, Kielce and Katowice regions in total 28%) followed by Greater Poland. Many Poles from Bosnia settled around Bolesławiec.

See also 
Lower Silesian Voivodeship
Niederschlesischer Oberlausitzkreis
Territorial Association of Silesia

References

 
Province of Lower Silesia
Provinces of Prussia
1919 establishments in Germany
1945 disestablishments in Germany
Former eastern territories of Germany